Giulio Cesare Bergera or Giulio Cesare Barbera (1595–1660) was a Roman Catholic prelate who served as Archbishop of Turin (1643–1660).

Biography
Giulio Cesare Bergera was born in 1595 in Turin, Italy.
On 23 February 1643, he was appointed during the papacy of Pope Urban VIII as Archbishop of Turin.
On 1 March 1643, he was consecrated bishop by Ciriaco Rocci, Cardinal-Priest of San Salvatore in Lauro, with Alfonso Gonzaga, Titular Archbishop of Rhodus and Lelio Falconieri, Titular Archbishop of Thebaes, serving as co-consecrators. 
He served as Archbishop of Turin until his death in 1660.

Episcopal succession
While bishop, he was the principal consecrator of:
Michele Beggiami (Beggiamo), Bishop of Mondovi (1656);
Filiberto Milliet de Faverges, Bishop of Aosta (1656); and 
Filiberto Alberto Bailly, Bishop of Aosta (1659).

References

External links and additional sources
 (for Chronology of Bishops) 
 (for Chronology of Bishops) 

17th-century Italian Roman Catholic archbishops
Bishops appointed by Pope Urban VIII
1595 births
1660 deaths